

Incumbents
Monarch - Philip IV

Events
May - beginning of the Catalan Revolt
September - Royal army occupies Tortosa
December 8 - a large Royal army under Pedro Fajardo de Zúñiga y Requesens headed for Barcelona, passing through Cambrils.
December 13–16 - Catalan Revolt: Battle of Cambrils. Catalan rebels massacred by Royal army after surrender
December 24 - Royal army takes Tarragona

Deaths
June 7 - Dalmau de Queralt, Count of Santa Coloma, Viceroy of Catalonia, assassinated
December 16 - Antoni d'Armengol, Jacint Vilosa, Carles Bertrolà i de Caldés, Catalan Revolt leaders at Cambrils, execution by garrote

References

 
1640s in Spain